Niša Saveljić (born 27 March 1970) is a Montenegrin former footballer who played as a defender.

At international level, Saveljić represented FR Yugoslavia in one World Cup (1998) and one European Championship (2000).

Club career
Born in Titograd, Saveljić made his senior debut with Budućnost in the 1988–89 campaign. He spent five seasons at the club, before surprisingly moving to Hajduk Kula in the summer of 1993. Due to his consistent performances with the club, Saveljić secured a transfer to Partizan in the 1995 winter transfer window. He won back-to-back championship titles in 1996 and 1997.

In the summer of 1997, Saveljić moved to France and signed with Bordeaux. He won the league title in his second season at the club. Afterwards, Saveljić spent another two years with Bordeaux, while also being loaned to his former club Partizan in the 2001 winter transfer window. He helped them win the 2000–01 FR Yugoslavia Cup, before returning to France. Over the next four years, Saveljić went on to play for Sochaux, Bastia, Guingamp and Istres.

In July 2005, Saveljić made another return to Partizan, signing a two-year deal. He was suspended in May 2006 for confronting with his teammate Danko Lazović after a training session. Eventually, Saveljić left the club by mutual agreement in August 2006.

International career
Saveljić made his debut for FR Yugoslavia in a 3–1 win against Hong Kong on 31 January 1995. He earned 32 caps and scored one goal for the national team, having represented the country at the 1998 FIFA World Cup and UEFA Euro 2000.

Post-playing career
In August 2017, Saveljić was appointed CEO of the newly founded Girondins de Bordeaux USA, as a result of a partnership between Bordeaux and Washington, D.C.-based club Olney Girls 99.

Personal life
Saveljić also holds French citizenship. He is the father of water polo player Nicolas Saveljić, the older brother of the late Monteniggers member Nebojša Saveljić, and the cousin of Montenegrin international footballer Esteban Saveljich.

Career statistics

Club

International

Honours

Club
Partizan
 First League of FR Yugoslavia: 1995–96, 1996–97
 FR Yugoslavia Cup: 2000–01
Bordeaux
 French Division 1: 1998–99
 Coupe de la Ligue: Runner-up 1997–98
 Trophée des Champions: Runner-up 1999
Sochaux
 Coupe de la Ligue: Runner-up 2002–03

International
Yugoslavia
 UEFA Under-21 Championship: Runner-up 1990

References

External links
 
 
 

1970 births
Living people
Footballers from Podgorica
Yugoslav footballers
Serbia and Montenegro footballers
Montenegrin footballers
Association football defenders
Yugoslavia under-21 international footballers
Serbia and Montenegro international footballers
1998 FIFA World Cup players
UEFA Euro 2000 players
FK Budućnost Podgorica players
FK Hajduk Kula players
FK Partizan players
FC Girondins de Bordeaux players
FC Sochaux-Montbéliard players
SC Bastia players
En Avant Guingamp players
FC Istres players
Yugoslav First League players
First League of Serbia and Montenegro players
Ligue 1 players
Serbian SuperLiga players
Serbia and Montenegro expatriate footballers
Expatriate footballers in France
Serbia and Montenegro expatriate sportspeople in France